Choreutis simplex is a moth in the family Choreutidae. It was described by Alexey Diakonoff in 1955. It is found in New Guinea.

References

Natural History Museum Lepidoptera generic names catalog

Choreutis
Moths described in 1955